Yangjiang, alternately romanized as Yeungkong, is a prefecture-level city in southwestern Guangdong Province in the People's Republic of China. It borders Maoming to the west, Yunfu to the north, Jiangmen to the east, and looks out to the South China Sea to the south. The local dialect is the Gaoyang dialect, a branch of Yue Chinese. During the 2020 census, its population was 2,602,959 inhabitants of whom 1,292,987 lived in the built-up (or metro) and largely urbanized area comprising Jiangcheng District and Yangdong County.

History
Under the Qing,  made up part of the commandery of Zhaoqing. It was later split off as a separate prefecture in its own right.

Administration
The prefecture-level city of Yangjiang administers 4 county-level divisions, including 2 districts, 1 county-level city and 1 counties.

Yangjiang is located, 2:30 hours from Guangzhou by bus. Notable areas include the Zhapo Beach and Hailing Island near Shapa Town.

Economy and culture
Yangjiang is the base of Yangjiang Shibazi, a knife manufacturer.

The Yangjiang Group artist collective is based in the city, and its members' work is largely inspired by the locality.

Yangjiang is home to six nuclear reactors, the largest nuclear power station in China.

Geography

The city is named for the Moyang River.

The city was hit by a magnitude 5.9 earthquake on July 25, 1969 which killed over 3,000 people. The area is known for its relatively high levels of natural background radiation.

Climate
Yangjiang has a monsoon-influenced humid subtropical climate (Köppen Cwa), with mild to warm winters and long, hot (but not especially so) summers, and very humid conditions year-round. Winter begins sunny and dry but becomes progressively wetter and cloudier. Autumn is sunny and dry. With monthly percent possible sunshine ranging from 18% in March to 55% in October, the city receives 1,757 hours of bright sunshine annually.

Notes

References

Citations

Bibliography
 , reprinted 2000.

External links

Government website of Yangjiang 
Official Yangjiang Travel Site 

 
Prefecture-level divisions of Guangdong